Bulbophyllum caldericola is a species of epiphytic or lithophytic orchid with inconspicuous, well-spaced pseudobulbs arranged along rhizomes which mostly hang from the surface on which they are growing. Each pseudobulb has a single, fleshy, channelled leaf and a single white flower with yellow tips. It grows on the trunks and larger branches of rainforest trees near the eastern border between New South Wales and Queensland.

Description
Bulbophyllum caldericola is an epiphytic or lithophytic herb with its rhizomes mostly hanging with only the base attached to the surface on which they are growing. The petals are much shorter than the sepals. The labellum is orange with a sharp bend near the middle. Flowering occurs from October to November.

Taxonomy and naming
Bulbophyllum caldericola was first formally described in 1993 by Gerry Walsh who published the description in The Orchadian from a specimen collected in the Tweed Range. The specific epithet (caldericola) is derived from the Latin word caldaria and the suffix -cola meaning "dweller" or "inhabitant". The distribution of this species includes the caldera of the Tweed Volcano.

Distribution and habitat
This orchid grows on trunks and larger branches of rainforest trees above  in the Tweed and Border Ranges.

References

caldericola
Orchids of New South Wales
Orchids of Queensland
Endemic orchids of Australia
Plants described in 1993